Ekaterina Panikanova (born 1975 St. Petersburg, Russia; resides in Italy) is a Russian surreal artist. She is known for her large installations of ink drawings, which she paints across the pages of vintage books. Reception for her work has been positive. In 2015, the Dutch wallpaper company NLXL licensed Panikanova's paintings to create a wallpaper.

Education
Panikanova graduated from the Academy of Fine Arts of St. Petersburg.

Bibliography
1, 2, 3, Fuoco. Mostra Personale di Ekaterina Panikanova (2013)

References

External links
  (in Italian)
 IGNITE! POP-UP EXHIBITION AT THE PAJAMA FACTORY, JULY 26

Russian surrealist artists
Russian women painters
Women surrealist artists
21st-century Russian painters
Living people
1975 births
Artists from Saint Petersburg